Anarkali was a legendary woman from Lahore, Mughal Empire which became a part present-day Pakistan, said to be loved by the 16th-century Mughal Prince Salim, who later became Emperor Jahangir. According to some accounts, Anarkali was the nickname of the courtesan Sharf-un-Nisa, though scholars hold varying opinions.

According to speculative and fictional accounts, Anarkali had an illicit relationship with Salim, whose father, Mughal Emperor Akbar, had her executed by immurement. The character often appears in movies, books and historical fiction and is depicted in the 1960 Bollywood film Mughal-e-Azam in which she is portrayed by Madhubala.

Historicity and development

Anarkali was first mentioned in the journal of English tourist and trader William Finch, who visited the Mughal Empire on 24 August 1608.

Western traveler accounts 

The earliest Western accounts about the relationship between Salim and Anarkali were written by British travellers William Finch and Edward Terry. Finch reached Lahore in February 1611, 11 years after the supposed death of Anarkali, to sell indigo he had purchased at Bayana on behalf of the East India Company. His account, which was written in early 17th-century English, gives the following information.

... is a faire monument for Don Sha his mother, one of the Akbar his wives, with whom it is said Sha Selim had to do ( her name was Immaeque Kelle, or Pomgranate kernell); upon notice of which the King [Akbar] caused her to be inclosed quicke within a wall in his moholl, where she died, and the King [Jahangir], in token of his love commands a sumptuous tomb to be built of stone in the midst of four square garden richly walled, with a gate and divers roomes over it. The convexity of the tomb he hath willed to be wrought in workes of gold with a large faire jounter with roomes over—head... (sic) ~ William Finch.

Anarkali had a relationship with Prince Salim (Jahangir). Upon notice of the relationship, King Akbar ordered her to be enclosed within a wall of his palace, where she died. Jahangir, as a token of his love, ordered a stone tomb to be built in the centre of a walled, four-square garden surrounded by a gate. As per description given by Finch, Jahangir  ordered the dome of the tomb to be wrought in works of gold.

Edward Terry, who visited a few years after William Finch, wrote Akbar had threatened to disinherit Jahangir for his relationship with Anarkali, the emperor's most-beloved wife, but on his death-bed he repealed the threat.

The legends 
According to Lisa Balabanlilar, the majority of legends present maid Anarkali  of Akbar's harem as a spouse, a concubine or a servant. As per Muni Lal, Anarkali was a maidservant in the household of Salim's mother, Mariam-uz-Zamani. A common thread in multiple accounts is after realizing the likelihood of amour between his son Salim and Anarkali, suspicious  Akbar got incensed and ordered to ensepulchre Anarkali alive in a wall. This brutality to Anarkali by Akbar caused enraged Salim to rebel against his father. Balabanlilar says though these captivating romantic  legends are widely believed  seem unverifiable and not likely to have happened.

Scholarly claims and discourse

Inscription 
The gravestone in the tomb for Anarkali bears the inscription:
Could I behold the face of my beloved once more,
I would thank God until the day of resurrection.
 ~ Majnun Salim Akbar

According to Andrew Topsfield, in his book Paintings from Mughal India, (p. 171 n. 18) Robert Skelton has identified these verses as being from the 13th-century poet Saʿdī.

Jahangir as Majnun 
According to Ebba Koch, Jahangir perceived himself as a Majnun prince king, who is almost mad in his love for his beloved ones.  Ebba Koch have his name inscribed as Majnun on the Anarkali's sarcophagus and had pictorials of himself painted as Majnun king; as late as 1618, he reared a pair of Sarus cranes, which are considered in Indian culture to be love birds named Layla and Majnun. Koch observed their breeding and wrote about them with keen interest. According to art historian Ram Nath the Salim Anarkali love legend can not be entirely fabricated myth since nobody would have had courage to inscribe his name in public as a Majnun (passionate lover) without his own approval. Nath says, Jahangir held his father Akbar in very high regard in his autobiography, still in 1599 he seems to have rebelled against Akbar and one most possible reason could be his tender romance with Anarkali was probably frustrated by the later (i.e. by Akbar).

Prominent guesses about who the Anarkali was 

 It was just a pomegranate garden 
 Anarkali as a wife of Emperor Akbar who fall in love with his son Jahangir.
 Anarkali was a concubine of Emperor Akbar(and Prince Daniyal's mother) who fell in love with his son Jahangir. 
 Anarkali was one of the wife of Jahangir speculated either  Sahib-i Jamal or  Nur Jahan

Just a pomegranate  garden 

According to Haroon Khalid, irrespective of incestuous relationship in popular imagination, it is very unlikely that an emperor's concubine would have fallen in love with his rebellious son. Khalid says the pomegranate garden is mentioned by Dara Shikoh, the grandson of Jahangir, in his work "Sakinat al-Auliya" as a location where the saint Mian Mir used to sit. According to Subhash Parihar, Dara also mentions the existence of a tomb in the garden but does not give it a name. According to Muhammed Baqir, the author of "Lahore Past and Present", Anarkali was originally just the name of the garden in which the tomb of Sahib-i-Jamal, one of the wife of Jahangir, was situated. The tomb later came to be named as that of Anarkali.

Sahib-i Jamal 

According to Muhammed Baqir, the tomb of Anarkali belonged to a woman named Sahib-i Jamal, another wife of Salim; the mother of the prince's second son Sultan Parvez and a daughter of the noble Zain Khan Koka. The daughter of Zain Khan was married to Salim on 18 June 1596.

According to Akbar Nama, Jahangir "became violently enamoured of the daughter of Zain Khan Koka. Akbar  was displeased at the impropriety, but he saw that his heart was immoderately affected, he, of necessity, gave his consent"   The translator of Akbar Nama, H. Beveridge, said Akbar objected to the marriage because the Prince was already married "to Zain Khan's niece" (actually the daughter of paternal uncle of Zain Khan, and hence Zain Khan's cousin). Akbar objected to marrying near relations.

According to Aniruddha Ray, inscribed year 1599 and name Salim are important since if it would have been built after he became emperor his alias name Jahangir would have been written. Ray says according to historians Akbar left Lahore on 1598 November 6, so it would be difficult to assume Akbar giving order of entombment in 1599. Ray says Jahangir's wife  Sahib-i Jamal died in 1599 so tomb may of hers.

Sharf-un-Nissa 

According to Haroon Khalid, a chronicler named Noor Ahmad Chishti in his Tehqiqat–i–Chishti first published in 1849 notes Anarkali or Sharf–un–Nissa as emperor Akbar's favorite concubine. According to Tehqiqat–i–Chishti  Anarkali expired when Akbar was on Deccan campaign. Khalid says  while Chishti's book does not speak about any love affair with Jahangir, but those were same times when Jahangir rebelled against his father Akbar. Khalid says one possibility is Akbar might have built mausoleum after his return from  Deccan campaign.

Khalid says popular narrative remains to be that of Anarkali was Akbar's concubine who crossed the red line and fell in love with Jahangir the Akbar's son. Khalid  says many historians too use the same narrative. Khalid says, according to Tareekh-e-Lahore, a 1892 book by Sayed Abdul Latif,  Anarkali's original name was Sharf-un-Nissa. According to  Ellison Banks Findly Anarkali's another name was Nadira Begum. Findly reminds that according to European traveler Finch  she was mother of Daniyal. Findly quotes Latif to have described Anarkali just as concubine and as legend given by him, Akbar observed Anarkali's return a smile to Jahangir in a mirror and he suspected worst and buried  the lady alive in a wall, the same  too had been mentioned by Finch ".. upon notice of which the King [Akabar] caused her to be inclosed quicke within a wall in his moholl, where shee dyed, .." According to Lisa Balabanlilar, usually it is considered that Jahangir married at least 20 times. Findly says if assumed dating of death of Anarkali to be correct then already several marriages of Jahangir were taken place, he had three sons by then and married later too, then in that case, it should have been out of character for Jahangir to have been madly in love in an incestuous relationship but still the legend of Jahangir and Anarkali  persists. Khalid  says same narrative as of Latif was developed by later fiction writers beginning with Imtiaj Ali Taj's 1922 play 'Anarkali'.

Prince Daniyal's mother 

Basing his analysis on the above two accounts, Abraham Eraly, the author of The Last Spring: The Lives and Times of the Great Mughals, wrote there "seems to have been an oedipal conflict between Akbar and Salim". He also considers it probable that Anarkali was the mother of Prince Daniyal Mirza.

Eraly supports his hypothesis by quoting an incident recorded by Abul Fazl, Akbar's court historian, according to whom, Salim was assaulted one evening by guards of Akbar's royal harem. A mad man wandered into Akbar's harem because of the carelessness of the guards. According to Abul Fazl, Salim caught the man but was himself mistaken for the intruder. The emperor arrived and was about to strike with his sword when he recognised Salim. It is likely  the intruder was Prince Salim and that the story of the mad man was concocted to hide the prince's indecency.

According to Subhash Parihar, the accounts of the British travellers, and consequently the presumption of Eraly, is unlikely because Prince Daniyal's mother died in 1596, which does not match the dates inscribed on the sarcophagus.

Nur Jahan 

A good deal of fiction has been written about Nur Jahan, obscuring her personality and social and political roles. Her first husband Sher Afghan died in a skirmish with Jahangir's foster brother Qutbuddin Koka in 1607. Jahangir fell in love with Nur Jahan and married her on 25 May 1611. According to Masudul Hasan  and also Lisa Balabanlilar, a popular legend exists that Jahangir had seen Nur Jahan in childhood and attracted to her but Akbar had not given the permission to marry with her, when Jahangir ascended the throne he got her husband killed and married her. Art historian Ram Nath gives credence to this theory saying for unknown reasons Nur Jahan's first marriage to Sher Afghan took place in 1599 when she was almost 22 in a way age wise too delayed marriage of girls of historical times. Nath says it is quite possible that Jahangir might have seen her, shown interest but his father Akbar denied permission taking political considerations into account.    Nath says while modern biographers like Beniprasad do not put faith in this legend, but   to say no contemporary traveler mentioned this legend is incorrect. Nath points out that  De Laet  mentions his another contemporary traveler  Pelsaert saying Jahangir loved Nur Jahan even before her marriage to Sher Afghan but Akbar intervened otherwise. According to Nath it is not impossible for Jahangir to have engineered  murder of Nur Jahan's first husband (1607) and suppressed the real cause of the conflict of his love interest.      

Hasan and also Balabanlilarsay say this legend is historically proved to be false and he got attracted to her and married with her when Nur Jahan was already widowed and she was in her 30s  and Jahangir in his 40s. According to  Archana Garodia Gupta the legend of prior love with Nur Jahan is unlikely because after Nur Jahan's first marriage with Sher Afgan, Jahangir had accompanied with him on campaign Mewar and also awarded a title on Shera Afgan.

According to other accounts, after Akbar's death, Salim (Jahangir) recalled Anarkali and they married. She was given a new name, Nur Jahan.

Nur Jahan's father went to the sub-continent during the reign of Akbar and entered into his service, and was quickly promoted through the ranks on merit. In 1607, Nur Jahan was taken to the court as a royal ward. She was beautiful and intelligent, and attracted Jahangir's attention.

Nur Jehan, died in 1645, 16 years after Jahangir's death and was buried near the tomb of Jahangir in tomb at Shahdara, Lahore.

Opinion of historian Ram Nath 

Art historian R. Nath said Jahangir had no wife on record bearing the name or title Anarkali, to whom the emperor could have built a tomb and dedicated a couplet with a suffix Majnun. He writes:  [it is] absolutely improbable that the grand Mughal emperor would address his married wife as yar, designate himself as majnun and aspire to see her face once again. Had he not seen her enough? Obviously she was not his married wife but only his beloved, to whom he would take the liberty to be romantic and a little poetic too, and it appears to be a case of an unsuccessful romance of a disappointed lover... The prince could not save her, though it is on record that he was so unhappy with his father in this year 1599 that he defied his orders and revolted. It may be recalled that Mehrunissa (later Nurjahan Begum) was also married to Sher Afgan the same year and the young Prince was so dejected and disturbed on the failure of his two romances and annihilation of his tender feelings of love that he went as far as to defy Akbar.

Personalities and timeline

Fictional portrayals 

Anarkali has been the subject of a number of Indian, Bangladeshi and Pakistani books, plays and films. The earliest, most-celebrated historical play about her, Anarkali, was written by Imtiaz Ali Taj in Urdu and performed in 1922. The play was made into a film Loves of a Mughal Prince, which was released in India in 1928 and stars Taj as Akbar. Another Indian silent film about the courtesan, Anarkali, was released in 1928 by R.S. Choudhury, who remade it in Hindi with the same title in 1935. Bina Rai portrayed Anarkali in Anarkali, a 1953 Indian film. In 1955, Akkineni Nageswara Rao and Anjali Devi starred in Anarkali. Kunchacko directed Anarkali, an Indian Tamil-language film, in 1966.

In 1960, K. Asif's landmark film Mughal-e-Azam was released in India with Madhubala in the role of Anarkali and Dilip Kumar as Prince Salim. According to Katherine Butler Schofield, while as per rumor peddled by European travelers, the emperor Akbar ensepulchred Anarkali alive, the movie Mughal‐e‐Azam gives the historical legend a twist wherein Akbar himself  lets Anarkali  run away clandestinely. Schofield says in this case film producer seemingly twists the plot finding it difficult to reconcile idealized national hero of modern times had been legendarily cruel to entomb a woman alive. In 1979, Telugu superstar N. T. Rama Rao directed and acted in the film Akbar Salim Anarkali, featuring himself as Akbar, Nandamuri Balakrishna as Salim and Deepa as Anarkali.

In Pakistan, Anarkali was released in 1958 with Noor Jehan in the titular role, based on the Imtiaz Ali Taj play/script as adapted by Hakim Ahmad Shuja for his son Anwar Kamal Pasha's direction. Iman Ali portrayed Anarkali in Shoaib Mansoor's short music video series on the theme Ishq (love) in 2003.

In the 2013 Ekta Kapoor's television series Jodha Akbar, she was portrayed by Heena Parmar while Saniya Touqeer played young Anarkali. A daily soap titled "Dastan-e-Mohabbat...Salim Anarkali" in which Prince Salim is played by Shaheer Sheikh and his beloved Anarkali by Sonarika Bhadoria, was aired on Colors TV.

See also 
 Tomb of Anarkali
Layla and Majnun
 Anarkali Bazaar
 Madhubala

Bibliography non-fictional 

 Dad, Aisha. 2022. 'Through the Looking Glass': The Narrative Performance of Anarkali. Doctoral dissertation, Harvard University Graduate School of Arts and Sciences.
 Nath, Prof R.. India As Seen by William Finch (1608-11 A.D): (With an Introduction to Medieval Travelogue). N.p., Independently Published, 2020.
 Sen Gupta, Subhadra. MAHAL: Power and Pageantry in the Mughal Harem. India, Hachette India, 2019.
 Early Travels in India, 1583-1619. India, Alpha Editions, 2020.
 Choudhry, Zulfiqar Ali. Anarkali. United Kingdom, Whyte Tracks publishing, 2017.
 Khawaja, Mabel Deane. “The Entombed Slave Girl of the Moguls: A Victim of Imperialism.” International Journal of Critical Cultural Studies, vol. 14, no. 2, June 2016, pp. 1–9. EBSCOhost, https://doi.org/10.18848/2327-0055/cgp/v14i02/1-9.
 Moosvi, Shireen. The invention and persistence of a legend—The Anārkalī story. Studies in People's History, Volume: 1 issue: 1, page(s): 63-68. Article first published online: June 1, 2014; Issue published: June 1, 2014  https://doi.org/10.1177/2348448914537345 
 Schofield, Katherine Butler. (2012), The Courtesan Tale: Female Musicians and Dancers in Mughal Historical Chronicles, c.1556–1748. Gender & History, 24: 150-171. https://doi.org/10.1111/j.1468-0424.2011.01673.x 
 Sharma, Sunil. “Forbidden Love, Persianate Style: Re-Reading Tales of Iranian Poets and Mughal Patrons.” Iranian Studies, vol. 42, no. 5, 2009, pp. 765–779., doi:10.1080/00210860903306044. 
 Glover, William J.. Making Lahore Modern: Constructing and Imagining a Colonial City. United Kingdom, U of Minnesota Press, 2008.
 Lal, Ruby. Domesticity and Power in the Early Mughal World. United Kingdom, Cambridge University Press, 2005.
 Chaudhry, Nazir Ahmad. Anarkali, Archives and Tomb of Sahib Jamal: A Study in Perspective. Pakistan, Sang-e-Meel Publications, 2002.
 Bāqir, Muḥammad. Lahore: Past And Present (being An Account Of Lahore Compiled From Original Sources). India, Low Price Publications, 1996.

 Asher, Catherine Ella Blanshard, et al. Architecture of Mughal India. United Kingdom, Cambridge University Press, 1992. p 118.
 Quayum, Mohammad A. "From A String of Sweet Pearls, Vol. II (1922)". The Essential Rokeya. Leiden, The Netherlands: Brill, 2013. https://doi.org/10.1163/9789004255876_004 Web.
 H.Beveridge, Visit to Umarkot, Calcutta Review. India, University of Calcutta, 1900. Page 67, 68, 69 
  

 Panjab Gazetteer. India, n.p, 1883. Page 177.

Bibliography fiction and literature 

Bombay Cinema's Islamicate Histories. United Kingdom, Intellect Books Limited, 2022.
 Ray, Neil. The Autobiography of Time: The Saga of Human Civilization: Ambition, Greed and Power from the Dawn of Man. United Kingdom, Archway Publishing, 2020. Semi fiction
 Sharma, Manimugdha. Allahu Akbar: Understanding the Great Mughal in Today's India. India, Bloomsbury Publishing. 2019
 Isaac, Megan Lynn. Suzanne Fisher Staples: The Setting Is the Story. United Kingdom, Scarecrow Press, 2009.
 Sundaresan, Indu. The Twentieth Wife: A Novel. United States, Washington Square Press, 2003.
 Reviewed Work: Anarkali, a Sanskrit Play in ten acts, by V. Raghavan Palsule, G. B. Annals of the Bhandarkar Oriental Research Institute, vol. 54, no. 1/4, 1973, pp. 301–03. JSTOR, http://www.jstor.org/stable/41692219.  
 Taj, Afroz. Two Anarkalis: Saghar Nizami’s Dream Drama and the Deconstruction of the Parsi Theatre. Southeast Review of Asian Studies Volume 32 (2010), pp. 177–92.  
 DÉSOULIÈRES, ALAIN. Religious culture and folklore in the Urdu historical drama Anarkali, revisited by Indian cinema. Book: Indian Literature and Popular Cinema, 2007. Routledge ISBN 9780203933299  
 Rini Bhattacharya Mehta (2011) Ur-national and secular mythologies: popular culture, nationalist historiography and strategic essentialism, South Asian History and Culture, 2:4, 572-588, DOI: 10.1080/19472498.2011.605300

Notes

References

Sources

External links 

 Anarkali Tomb. University of Alberta.

Indian legends
Indian literature
Indian folklore
Women of the Mughal Empire